The 2015 Colgate Raiders football team represented Colgate University in the 2015 NCAA Division I FCS football season. They were led by second-year head coach Dan Hunt and played their home games at Crown Field at Andy Kerr Stadium. They were a member of the Patriot League. They finished the season 9–5, 6–0 in conference play to win the Patriot League championship. They received the Patriot League's automatic bid to the FCS Playoffs, where they defeated the New Hampshire in the first round and James Madison in the second round before losing in the quarterfinals to Sam Houston State.

Schedule

Source: Schedule

References

Colgate
Colgate Raiders football seasons
Patriot League football champion seasons
Colgate
Colgate Raiders football